Daniel Burt may refer to:

Daniel Burt (comedian), writer and comedian from Victoria, Australia
Daniel Burt (author), American author of several bestselling books
Daniel Burt (politician) (1847–1924), Ontario farmer and political figure
Daniel Raymond Burt (1804–1884), American businessman and territorial legislator